Hathial is an ancient archaeological site next to Bhir Mound, just south of Sirkap, in the area of Taxila in Pakistan. It is quite a large site, in which red burnished ware and various materials were discovered similar to those of Charsadda. This suggest that the establishment of the Hathial site may go back as far as 1000 BCE. The adjoining settlement of Bhir Mound was only created later, probably around 500 BCE.

The pottery found at the site has been dated to the period between 1000 BCE and 400 BCE, and thus constitute an interesting intermediary, pre-Achaemenid period, between the Late Harappan of the Indus Valley and the Early Historic period.

References

Bibliography
 
 
 

Taxila Tehsil